Famenin County is in Hamadan province, Iran. The capital of the county is the city of Famenin. At the 2006 census, the county's population (as Famenin District of Hamadan County) was 40,541 in 9,928 households. The following census in 2011 counted 42,485 people in 12,187 households, by which time the district had been separated from the county to form Famenin County. At the 2016 census, the county's population was 39,359 in 12,182 households.

Administrative divisions

The population history and structural changes of Famenin County's administrative divisions over three consecutive censuses are shown in the following table. The latest census shows two districts, four rural districts, and one city.

References

 

Counties of Hamadan Province